Robert Lowther (1741–1777) was an English Member of Parliament, the younger son of Robert Lowther and Catherine Pennington and younger brother of James Lowther, 1st Earl of Lonsdale.

Brought into Parliament for the Government through his older brother's interest, Robert defied the ministry and voted in favor of John Wilkes in 1763. For this, Lonsdale had him removed from his seat, and Robert died in obscurity.

References

Lowther pedigree 2

Members of the Parliament of Great Britain for English constituencies
1741 births
1777 deaths
Robert
British MPs 1754–1761
British MPs 1761–1768